The Council of Troyes was convened by Bernard of Clairvaux on 13 January 1129 in the city of Troyes. The council, largely attended by French clerics, was assembled to hear a petition by Hugues de Payens, head of the Knights Templar. Pope Honorius II did not attend the council, sending the papal legate, Matthew, cardinal-bishop of Albano. The council addressed issues concerning the Templar Order and a dispute between the bishop of Paris and king of France.

Background

Founded by Hugues de Payens in 1119, the Knights Templar had gained the backing of King Baldwin II at the Council of Nablus in 16 January 1120. In 1126, Baldwin had commissioned two clerics to speak with Bernard of Clairvaux seeking papal recognition and a Rule for the Templar Order. Later, Baldwin sent Hugues to Europe to convince Fulk of Anjou to marry his daughter Melisende and to raise an army for a crusade against Damascus. Hugues's other objectives were to gain papal recognition, recruit members for the Order, and establish a permanent Templar base in Europe. According to William of Tyre, at the time of the council of Troyes the Order had only 9 members.

Council
Bernard convened the council on 13 January 1129. The attendees, which were mainly French clerics, consisted of the archbishops Renaud of Reims and Henry of Sens, ten bishops, four Cistercian abbots, a number of other abbots, and the clerical scholars, Alberic of Reims and Fulger. Pope Honorius was not in attendance at the council, instead sending his papal legate, Matthew, cardinal-bishop of Albano.

Templar Order
The head of the Order, Hugues de Payen, petitioned the council for a Rule for the Templars.
The council passed, with considerable influence from Bernard, the Templar rule, similar to that of Rule of Saint Benedict. The Templar Rule consolidated the monastic tenets of poverty, chastity, obedience and added a vow to defend the Holy Land. The Rule was originally written in Latin, but was translated into French sometime after the Council of Pisa in 1135. Due to a petition by Pope Honorius II and Patriarch Stephen of Jerusalem, the Templars were required wear a white habit.

Disputes
The Council addressed disputes concerning Bishop Stephen of Paris and King Louis VI of France.

Aftermath
Following the Council of Troyes' decision concerning the Templar Order, the Templars gained popularity throughout France, Portugal, Spain, and Provence. The influx of gold, silver, grants of properties, and men, allowed Hugues de Payens to appoint Payen de Montdidier to oversee France. Even nobility were joining the Order, with Raymond-Berengar III, Count of Barcelona, being accepted as a companion member on 14 July 1130.

Notes

References

Sources

1129 in Europe
Knights Templar
12th-century Catholic Church councils